Lhotka is a municipality and village in Mělník District in the Central Bohemian Region of the Czech Republic. It has about 300 inhabitants.

Administrative parts
The village of Hleďsebe is an administrative part of Lhotka.

References

Villages in Mělník District